Countdown: Inspiration4 Mission to Space is a 2021 American five-part docuseries jointly produced by Netflix and Time Studios to chronicle, in near real-time, the successful SpaceX Inspiration4 orbital mission which occurred in September 2021.

Conception and announcement
Netflix confirmed the production of the documentary series about the first all-civilian orbital mission on its Twitter account on 3 August 2021. Inspiration4's Twitter account added its own commentary to the Netflix announcement the next day, saying: "We can't wait for you to watch "Countdown: Inspiration4 Mission To Space" on @netflix, covering our crew's exciting, out-of-this-world journey". The series was designed to track the recruitment process, preparation for and, in as close to real time as possible, the launch of the first all-civilian orbital flight, which would be accomplished by Elon Musk's company SpaceX. The documentary was co-produced by Time Studios, and is directed by Jason Hehir, creator of the 2020 basketball documentary series about Michael Jordan, The Last Dance.

Netflix's decision to co-produce the documentary came weeks after two other billionaire passenger suborbital spaceflights launched and landed safely in July 2021: the flight of Virgin Galactic's VSS Unity, including Richard Branson, and Blue Origin's New Shepard flight, including Jeff Bezos. According to The Verge, Netflix also planned to release a "hybrid live-action animation special for kids and families" about Inspiration4 on the day before the launch.

For Netflix, Inspiration4 represents a new shift to near real-time documentary production. The launch was scheduled for 15 September 2021, and the plan was for Netflix to release two pairs of episodes about it on 6 September and 13 September 2021. The final of the series was planned for 30 September 2021, assuming the launch happens on its original schedule. It was reported by Deadline Hollywood that "The quick-turnaround series will take viewers behind the scenes with the four crew members — from their unconventional selection and intensive months-long commercial astronaut training, through the intimate and emotional moments leading up to liftoff", and that "The final episode, which premieres just days after the mission is completed, will feature unprecedented access inside the spacecraft, capturing the launch and the crew".

Production 
The project began in January 2021 before the space mission was announced. The Inspiration4 team hadn't chosen the astronauts yet, so the series was in a position to capture every step of the recruitment and training process. The director Jason Hehir said that it was "being produced as the historic moment unfolds; time is of the essence". His involvement started on 1 April 2021 with an email from a Netflix executive. Regarding why it would be on Netflix, vice president of strategic communications and outreach for Space Foundation, Richard B. Cooper, said "You're taking the message and the story where people are consuming it most".

Hehir said this was the most complex production plan he had ever been a part of, and that documenting different crew members training at different times in different time zones, while working towards a space launch, was "quite a tall task", and that "This is a more ambitious production than anything I've ever been a part of, on several levels". He also reported that "This is a true mission to space... ordinary people will be operating a spacecraft for three days as it orbits the Earth, higher than anyone has been since the Apollo missions ... the ambition of this is inspiring".

The mission commander Jared Isaacman said "I think we all lost track of the fact that there was a documentary made throughout all this... But we're so thankful that they did, because we have not had an opportunity to stop and pause, even for a second, over the last five months or so to just reflect on all these important milestones. So we're happy to be doing this for us. We're so happy they're doing it for everyone... Because, that's what Inspiration4 is supposed to be about: inspiring people... and I think that will be explored in pretty decent detail throughout the documentary".

Director Hehir was asked about having a contingency plan for the series finale, which planned to cover the space mission itself, in the event of a mission failure. He said "It was obviously a radioactive conversation that no one wanted to have... We had loose plans for what we were going to do with the final episode but the reality is that SpaceX likely would've seized all the footage. I don’t know how we would've made a doc with what we would've been given. It would've been talking heads and felt like a news report. But I am confident we would've made an episode."

With the success of the mission, Netflix got "bragging rights with the first limited series shot in space", and Hehir made the most of his access by "foregrounding the footage from the cupola, which includes intimate and personable moments as the crew capture themselves floating against a backdrop than in any other context would register as science fiction." Hehir said he trained the astronauts to record themselves with an iPhone designated as the Netflix phone, and coached the crew on how to make a documentary. He said "We were at the mercy of people who have a lot of other things to worry about besides producing a documentary. Luckily, they nailed it... It’s the best photography ever taken in space by an astronaut." Hehir believes the crew deserved an award for their cinematography, saying "It’s the most ambitious cinematographic achievement I’ve been a part of... These people should be listed on the list of cinematographers. They captured stunning images."

Trailers 
On 19 August 2021, Netflix released the series' first trailer on YouTube, which claimed that Inspiration4 will be the "next epic leap forward for civilians". The one-minute teaser shows the crew in training and focuses on aspects of the mission such as overcoming disability, fundraising for St. Jude Children's Research Hospital, and dealing with family concerns about the risk of spaceflight. The trailer introduces all four civilian astronauts: billionaire entrepreneur Jared Isaacman who purchased the flight for all four passengers, Christopher Sembroski who received his seat through a charity raffle, Sian Proctor who received hers through an application process, and 29 year old Hayley Arceneaux, the mission's chief medical officer who is a physician assistant at St. Jude's where she received cancer treatments as a ten year old.

On 2 September 2021, less than two weeks before the scheduled mission launch, Collider reported that Netflix had released a new trailer "giving us a more formal introduction to the four civilians journeying to space. We get a look at some of the personal stakes for each crew member and what drives them in their mission ... The whole trailer builds up each of the civilians as one of us, each with relatable goals and ambitions that carry them forward. Its sentiment is summed up perfectly by a line near the end: 'These people are you and me.' As an extra feel-good aspect to this mission, it'll also act as a massive US$200 million fundraiser for St. Jude to help battle childhood cancer". It also reported that "the live launch of Inspiration4 will be broadcast on Netflix's YouTube channel".

Promotion and release 
SpaceX founder Elon Musk used social media to urge his followers to watch the Netflix series. On the day of Inspiration4's launch, he also used Twitter to urge his followers to tune into the Netflix YouTube channel to watch the launch of the historic mission.

The first four episodes were released for streaming on schedule, airing 6 and 13 September 2021. The final episode was released on 30 September and captured the Inspiration4 crew's launch, orbital activities, and successful return to Earth.

Episodes

Reception 
An early review of the series by The Daily Beast posted when only the first two episodes were available reported that "Countdown: Inspiration4 Mission to Space insistently pushes its message from the get-go". That message, according to Time's chief science editor Jeffrey Kluger, is that "Inspiration4 is "a hinge point in history, and will kick the doors open to space for the rest of us"". But it reports that the early episodes do "very little to take a critical look at this enterprise. At least in its initial pair of installments, the docuseries plays like a PR product, casting everything in glowing terms, including its portraits of the mission's four astronauts". The review also says "One can imagine Countdown: Inspiration4 Mission to Space's more timely later episodes supplying greater suspense. Yet in its early going... the entire affair mostly comes across as prepackaged corporate publicity". It also admits that the hazards of spaceflight are "real, and they’ll certainly be front-and-center as Inspiration4 makes its way from the planning stages to the launchpad... one hopes that, as its subjects enter orbit, Countdown: Inspiration4 Mission to Space quiets down about its own importance, and lets its action speak for itself".

The Guardian reviewed the early episodes saying, "There's a gameshow undercurrent to Countdown, the Netflix series, whose first two episodes predominantly serve to introduce viewers to the civilian astronauts, selected by a Willy Wonka - like arbitrary process tied to four core mission values... It remains to be seen... if Inspiration4 will push past skepticism of ultra-expensive, privately funded space flight. Regardless, the mission, and the messaging attached to it, will be televised, bringing the vast frontier to your personal screen".

A review by MIT Technology Review said that, 

Regarding the completed finale, IndieWire reported that,

Jeff Foust indicated that while the exclusive footage and the interviews were fascinating, the docuseries lacked drama, and expressed the concern that it could be a new template for Space Age media relations

Companion products
Netflix had a live webcast of the launch of Inspiration4 on its YouTube channel which was hosted from New York by Soledad O'Brien and Karamo Brown. They were joined by astronaut Leland D. Melvin to provide the viewpoint from a professional astronaut. Jeffrey Kluger, Catherine Coleman and Ron Garan were in Florida to provide impressions from KSC.

A special edition of Time, The New Space Age: Inside the historic Inspiration4 mission to open rocket travel for all, was published as a commemorative book and companion to the series.

See also 

 Space Adventures Crew Dragon mission

References

External links

2021 American television series debuts
2021 American television series endings
2020s American documentary television series
English-language Netflix original programming
Netflix original documentary television series
Documentary television series about historical events in the United States
Television series about space programs
Inspiration4
Space tourists